Candy Apple Grey is the fifth album by the alternative rock band Hüsker Dü, released in 1986. It was their first major label album, though Warner Bros. had initially lobbied to release Flip Your Wig until the band decided to let SST have it. Candy Apple Grey also marks the completion of the band's transition from hardcore punk to a more well-rounded sonic style which would later come to be known as alternative rock. As usual, Bob Mould and Grant Hart individually wrote tracks on the album.  While the band's earlier, more frenetic style is still evident, Candy Apple Grey also features more introverted, toned-down material, including a relatively large amount of acoustic guitar.

The singles released from this album were "Sorry Somehow" and "Don't Want to Know If You Are Lonely", both written and sung by Hart. The latter was accompanied by a promotional video which earned airtime on MTV. Candy Apple Grey was the first Hüsker Dü album to chart on the Billboard Top 200, but despite receiving exposure on radio as well as MTV, it got no higher than #140.

Re-release
Candy Apple Grey was officially re-released on Record Store Day (April 19, 2014) on heavyweight grey vinyl.

Track listing

Personnel
Hüsker Dü
Bob Mould – guitar, vocals, keyboards, percussion, producer
Grant Hart – drums, vocals, percussion, keyboards, producer
Greg Norton – bass guitar
 Technical
 Steven Fjelstad – engineer
 Howie Weinberg – mastering
 Daniel Corrigan – cover photography

Covers
"Dead Set on Destruction" was covered by Minneapolis band Trip Shakespeare on its 1992 EP Volt.
"Don't Want to Know If You Are Lonely" was covered by Catherine Wheel, Mega City Four, Political Asylum, Green Day, and Prong, among others.

References

Hüsker Dü albums
1986 albums
Warner Records albums